Robert W. "Bobby" Mathieson (born June 16, 1956, in New York City) is an American politician. A Democrat, he was elected to the Virginia House of Delegates in November 2007. He represented the 21st district in the city of Virginia Beach.
Bobby lost this seat in 2009 to Ron Villanueva.  On July 1, 2011, the United States Senate confirmed Bobby Mathieson for U.S. Marshal serving Virginia's Eastern District.

Notes

References

 (Campaign website)

External links

1956 births
Living people
United States Marshals
Democratic Party members of the Virginia House of Delegates
Saint Leo University alumni
Politicians from Virginia Beach, Virginia
21st-century American politicians